Remaye Orvil Kelvin Campbell (born 7 July 2000) is an English professional footballer who plays as a forward for English club Ilkeston town fc.

Professional career
Campbell came through the Notts County Academy, eventually starring for the under-18 team and leading the league in scoring before "graduating" in 2018. He made his debut with the first team on 14 August 2018, coming on for Andy Kellett during the second half of a League Cup match against Middlesbrough. On 3 November 2018, Campbell went on a one-month loan at Grantham Town.

On 8 October 2019, he re-joined Grantham Town on loan for the remainder of the season.

He signed for Northern Premier League Division One Midlands side Ilkeston Town on a free transfer in August 2021.

Career statistics

References

External links
 
 

Living people
2000 births
English footballers
Association football forwards
Notts County F.C. players
Grantham Town F.C. players
Ilkeston Town F.C. players
National League (English football) players
Northern Premier League players
Black British sportspeople
Footballers from Nottingham